is the Toei Company's 37th entry in its long-running Super Sentai metaseries of Japanese tokusatsu television series following Tokumei Sentai Go-Busters. Kyoryuger aired on TV Asahi from February 17, 2013 to February 9, 2014, joining Kamen Rider Wizard and later Kamen Rider Gaim in TV Asahi's Super Hero Time programming block. Its footage would later be used for the American Power Rangers season, Power Rangers Dino Charge and its follow up season, Dino Super Charge, and gained a South Korean-exclusive sequel, Power Rangers Dino Force Brave.

Story

Long ago in the time of dinosaurs, the Deboth Army invades Earth to the point of the extinction of the dinosaurs but they were defeated by Wise God Torin and the Zyudenryu during the first invasion. In the present day, the Deboth Army resurface as they resume their invasion. To counter the revived threat, Torin selects five brave individuals who must defeat their respective Zyudenryu first in order to acquire their powers to become the "People of the Strongosaurs", the Kyoryugers.

Episodes

Production
Zyuden Sentai Kyoryuger is the third Sentai series with a dinosaur motif (after Kyōryū Sentai Zyuranger and Bakuryū Sentai Abaranger); this time mixed with electricity and up-tempo musical genres such as Samba. Ryo Ryusei, who portrays Daigo Kiryu, said he will find it difficult to live up to the role as the hero in the series. Yamato Kinjo, who portrays Nobuharu Udo, turns 30 within the year and spoke of how he felt it might be difficult to portray a hero to children so much younger than he is.

Critics have noted a drastic shift in the casting of Kyoryuger. Toei producer Takahito Ōmori commented on the lack of a yellow warrior in the series, something that has not happened since Dengeki Sentai Changeman, by noting that the color yellow has become associated with females for the modern generation of viewers and thus would not be able to properly portray the brutish strength a male character is capable of portraying to match with the concept that the characters beat their dinosaur partners in battle. Ōmori also stated that they chose to make the blue warrior aged 32 to insert some oyaji gags, while also noting the use of Papaya Suzuki as the ending theme's choreographer to insert some levity, hot-blooded actor Shinji Yamashita as the red warrior's father, and the inclusion of Shigeru Chiba as the series' narrator who gives a high tension style to the show.

Films
The Kyoryugers make their debut appearance in Tokumei Sentai Go-Busters vs. Kaizoku Sentai Gokaiger: The Movie, and are the protagonists of the following films:

Super Hero Taisen Z

 is a film that was released in Japan on April 27, 2013 which featured the first crossover between characters of Toei's three main Tokusatsu franchises, Kamen Rider, Super Sentai, and the Space Sheriff Series, including other heroes from the Metal Heroes series as well. The protagonists of Space Sheriff Gavan: The Movie, Tokumei Sentai Go-Busters, and Kaizoku Sentai Gokaiger are featured, but the casts of Kamen Rider Wizard, Zyuden Sentai Kyoryuger, and Kamen Rider Fourze also participate in the film. The event of the movie takes place between Brave 10 and 11.

Gaburincho of Music

As with every year, Zyuden Sentai Kyoryuger appears in their own film titled , which is a musical, that was released in theaters on August 3, 2013, double-billed with the film for Kamen Rider Wizard. The event of the movie takes place between Brave 20 and 21.

Kyoryuger vs. Go-Busters

 was released in theaters on January 18, 2014. As with previous VS movies, this film features a crossover between the casts of Zyuden Sentai Kyoryuger and Tokumei Sentai Go-Busters while also bringing in cameos from the casts of Kyōryū Sentai Zyuranger and Bakuryū Sentai Abaranger. The event of the movie takes place between Brave 36 and 37.

Kamen Rider Taisen

It also features the return of characters from previous Kamen Rider Series, most notably Hiroshi Fujioka of the original Kamen Rider.

ToQger vs. Kyoryuger

 is the VS team-up movie between Ressha Sentai ToQger and Zyuden Sentai Kyoryuger. The film was released in Japanese theaters on January 17, 2015.

Ultra Super Hero Taisen
A crossover film, titled  featuring the casts of Kamen Rider Ex-Aid, Amazon Riders, Uchu Sentai Kyuranger, and Doubutsu Sentai Zyuohger, was released in Japan on March 25, 2017. This movie also celebrates the 10th anniversary of Kamen Rider Den-O and features the spaceship Andor Genesis from the Xevious game, which is used by the movie's main antagonists, as well as introduces the movie-exclusive Kamen Rider True Brave, played by Kamen Rider Brave's actor Toshiki Seto from Kamen Rider Ex-Aid, and the villain Shocker Great Leader III, played by the singer Diamond Yukai. In addition, individual actors from older Kamen Rider and Super Sentai TV series, Ryohei Odai (Kamen Rider Ryuki), Gaku Matsumoto (Shuriken Sentai Ninninger), Atsushi Maruyama (Zyuden Sentai Kyoryuger), and Hiroya Matsumoto (Tokumei Sentai Go-Busters) reprise their respective roles.

Special episodes
 is a special DVD by Kodansha that details Daigo and Utsusemimaru dealing with Nobuharu when he is possessed by the ghosts of Debo Tangosekku and Debo Tanabanta. With the assistance of Ramirez and Tessai however, the two Kyoryugers gain Spirit Ranger versions of the Pteragordon and Plezuon Zyudenchi to send the spirits back to Deboth Hell. The special concludes with a promo for the Kyoryuger movie and takes place between Brave 23 and 24.
 is a web-exclusive episode released on the official Brave Frontier YouTube channel as a collaboration between the Toei Company and video game producer Alim to promote the release of Brave Frontier 2 in Japan. This special also serves as a reunion between the series's original cast and is denoted as Brave 33.5, taking place between Brave 33 and 34.

V-Cinema
 is a direct-to-video film released on June 20, 2014, taking places between Brave 42 and 43. The main cast of Ryo Ryusei, Syuusuke Saito, Yamato Kinjo, Akihisa Shiono, Ayuri Konno, and Atsushi Maruyama reprise their roles from the series while also portraying a future generation of Kyoryugers introduced in the movie.

Video game
The Kyoryugers appear in their very own video game developed by Namco Bandai Games for the Nintendo 3DS called , released on August 8, 2013.

Cast
: <ref name="pamphlet">Zyuden Sentai Kyoryuger' Tokyo Dome City Prism Hall event promotional pamphlet</ref>
: 
: 
: 
: 
: 
: 
: 
: 
: 
: 
: 
: 
: 
: 
: 
Narration, Kyoryuger Equipment Voice, : 

Recurring cast

: 
: 
: 
: 
: 
: 
: 
, : 
: 

Guest stars

: 
: 
 (39): 
: 

Songs
Opening theme

Lyrics: Shoko Fujibayashi
Composition: Yusuke Mochida
Arrangement: Kousuke Yamashita, Yusuke Mochida
Artist: 
 Remixes of the song were used in the series:  in episode 31 and  sung by Syuusuke Saito, Yamato Kinjo, Akihisa Shiono, Ayuri Konno, and Marie Iitoyo during the climax of the final episode. The film Zyuden Sentai Kyoryuger vs. Go-Busters: The Great Dinosaur Battle! Farewell Our Eternal Friends uses a slow melody remix called . In the V-Cinema 100 Years After'', it is called  sung by Haruka Tomatsu as Canderrilla.
Ending theme

Lyrics: Saburo Yatsude, Hideaki Takatori
Composition: Hideaki Takatori
Arrangement: Hiroaki Kagoshima
Artist: Hideaki Takatori

Notes

References

External links
 at TV Asahi
 at Toei Company
 at Super-Sentai.net

Super Sentai
2013 Japanese television series debuts
2014 Japanese television series endings
Television series about dinosaurs
Prehistoric people in popular culture
Japanese comedy television series